The 1896 Cincinnati Reds season was a season in American baseball. The team finished in third place in the National League with a record of 77–50, 12 games behind the Baltimore Orioles.

Regular season 
After a late season collapse by the Reds in 1895, in which the team won only fourteen of their last thirty-nine games to fall completely out of the pennant race to an eighth-place finish, the club began to make changes to get younger players.

Buck Ewing returned as player-manager, and the team made a big trade, as Arlie Latham, Ed McFarland, Morgan Murphy and Tom Parrott were traded from Cincinnati to the St. Louis Browns for Red Ehret and Heinie Peitz.  Ehret struggled in 1895, with a 6–19 record and a 6.02 ERA.  His best season came in 1890 with the Louisville Colonels of the American Association, when Ehret was 25–14 with a 2.53 ERA in 43 games. Ehret also led the National League in shutouts with four during the 1893 season with the Pittsburgh Pirates.  Peitz hit .284 with two home runs and 65 RBI with the Browns in 1895.

The Reds also acquired Charlie Irwin from the Chicago Colts to play third base. Irwin missed most of the 1895 season, but in 1894 he batted .296 with eight home runs and 100 RBI with Chicago.

Offensively, Eddie Burke led the team with a .340 batting average and 120 runs scored, as well as hitting a homer and 52 RBI. Dummy Hoy also scored 120 runs, as he hit .298 with a team tying high four home runs and 57 RBI. Dusty Miller had a club high .321 average, 93 RBI and 76 stolen bases, as well as tying Hoy with four home runs. Bid McPhee had another solid season, as he hit .305 with a homer and 87 RBI while stealing 48 bases.

Frank Dwyer led the pitching staff with a 24–11 record and a 3.15 ERA in 36 games, 34 of them starts. Ehret went 18–14 with a 3.42 ERA in his first season with the Reds, which marked a big improvement over his horrible 1895 season with the Browns. Billy Rhines led the league with a 2.45 ERA, however, he missed some time due to injuries and finished the year with a record of 8–6 in 19 games.

Season summary 
After starting the year with a 9–7 record and in fifth place, Cincinnati posted ten wins in their next twelve games to improve to 19–9, and sit in first place in the National League. The Reds slipped out of first place with a 3–5 record in their next eight games, and continued to slump to a 27–20 record, fourth in the league.  Cincinnati then rebounded, going 14–2 in their next sixteen games to push their record to 41–22, and be in a first place tie with the Baltimore Orioles. The club stayed hot, going 12–2 in their next fourteen games to push their record to 53–24, and take over first place by themselves, three games up on the Orioles. Cincinnati then went 8–2 in their next ten games, and pushed their first place lead to five games over Baltimore, and a 34–6 record in their last forty games. Despite a solid 8–5 record in their next thirteen games, Cincinnati saw their five-game lead evaporate to only a half game over the red hot Orioles. As the season was coming to a close, the Reds completely fell out of the pennant race, as they lost eleven games in a row and would eventually finish in third place with a 77–50 record, 12.5 games behind Baltimore.

Season standings

Record vs. opponents

Roster

Player stats

Batting

Starters by position 
Note: Pos = Position; G = Games played; AB = At bats; H = Hits; Avg. = Batting average; HR = Home runs; RBI = Runs batted in

Other batters 
Note: G = Games played; AB = At bats; H = Hits; Avg. = Batting average; HR = Home runs; RBI = Runs batted in

Pitching

Starting pitchers 
Note: G = Games pitched; IP = Innings pitched; W = Wins; L = Losses; ERA = Earned run average; SO = Strikeouts

Other pitchers 
Note: G = Games pitched; IP = Innings pitched; W = Wins; L = Losses; ERA = Earned run average; SO = Strikeouts

Relief pitchers 
Note: G = Games pitched; W = Wins; L = Losses; SV = Saves; ERA = Earned run average; SO = Strikeouts

References

External links
1896 Cincinnati Reds season at Baseball Reference

Cincinnati Reds seasons
Cincinnati Reds season
Cincinnati Reds